Biskupiec is a town in Warmian-Masurian Voivodeship, north Poland.

Biskupiec may also refer to:

Biskupiec, Nowe Miasto County, Warmian-Masurian Voivodeship
Biskupiec, Kuyavian-Pomeranian Voivodeship (north-central Poland)

See also
Biskupice (disambiguation)
Bischofsburg